Hasan Mushaima is an opposition leader in Bahrain and the secretary-general of the Haq Movement, an important opposition party in Bahrain. Before forming Haq, he was a founding member of Al Wefaq and a leading figure in the 1994 uprising in Bahrain. He has campaigned for more democratic rights in Bahrain, and has been in prison in Bahrain since his arrest in 2011.

Political activity

1990s uprising 
The Bahraini government has placed Mushaima under arrest several times, twice arresting him during the 1994 uprising. He was later jailed from March 1995 to September 1995 and again from January 1996 till February 2001. Mushaima was re-arrested in February 2007 and jailed for one day, and then was arrested and imprisoned again from January 2009 to April 2009.

Political activities in 2000s 

In 2010 Mushaima traveled to Great Britain to be treated for lung cancer.

Bahraini uprising (2011–present) 

Mushaima announced plans to return to Bahrain during the protests in February 2011, but authorities detained him in Lebanon while en route, possibly at the request of the Bahraini government. Mushaima finally did return to Bahrain on Saturday, February 26, 2011. On that day,  he was described by the Associated Press as being "welcomed like a rock star," by protestors in Pearl Square. He reportedly told followers that "The dictator fell in Tunisia, the dictator fell in Egypt and the dictator should fall here."

On 7 March 2011, Mushaima along with Abdulwahab Hussain, the leader of Wafa movement, and Saeed Alshehabi, the leader of the Bahrain Freedom Movement, formed the "Alliance for the Republic" (Arabic:التحالف من أجل الجمهورية), because of their belief that the Bahraini regime lost legitimacy after the harsh crackdown on protesters using heavy weapons. One month after protests, the Gulf Cooperation Council sent 1,500+ PSF troops (1,000 Saudi, some Qatari troops and 500 Emirati policemen) to crush the popular uprising there and also sent the Kuwaiti Navy to stop any aid to the protesters by sea. After the protesters were kicked from the Pearl Roundabout, many known rights activists operating in Bahrain were arrested, including Mushaima.

On 22 June 2011, Mushaima was sentenced to life imprisonment by a military court for "attempting to overthrow the monarchy".

On 30 April 2012, a Bahraini court ordered a civilian retrial of Mushaima and 20 other men convicted of leading the uprising.

In 2018, Mushaima's son Ali Mushaima began a hunger strike outside the Bahraini embassy in London, protesting the denial of medical treatment for political prisoners including Hassan Mushaima.

On 15 September 2021, he declined a conditional release offer.

See also

Bahrain Thirteen

References

Front Line: Ongoing harassment of Bahraini human rights defenders
 Clashes erupt after two opposition figures are held in Bahrain

Bahraini activists
Bahraini dissidents
Bahraini Shia Muslims
Haq Movement politicians
Living people
1948 births
People of the Bahraini uprising of 2011
Republicanism in Bahrain
Bahraini prisoners sentenced to life imprisonment
Prisoners sentenced to life imprisonment by Bahrain
Political prisoners in Bahrain